Alison Patrick may refer to:

 Alison Patrick (historian) (1921–2009), Australian historian
 Alison Peasgood (born Alison Patrick, 1987), British paratriathlete